The Wilcoxon signed-rank test is a non-parametric statistical hypothesis test used either to test the location of a population based on a sample of data, or to compare the locations of two populations using two matched samples. The one-sample version serves a purpose similar to that of the one-sample Student's t-test. For two matched samples, it is a paired difference test like the paired Student's t-test (also known as the "t-test for matched pairs" or "t-test for dependent samples"). The Wilcoxon test can be a good alternative to the t-test when population means are not of interest; for example, when one wishes to test whether a population's median is nonzero, or whether there is a better than 50% chance that a sample from one population is greater than a sample from another population.

History
The test is named for Frank Wilcoxon (1892–1965) who, in a single paper, proposed both it and the rank-sum test for two independent samples. The test was popularized by Sidney Siegel (1956) in his influential textbook on non-parametric statistics. Siegel used the symbol T for the test statistic, and consequently, the test is sometimes referred to as the Wilcoxon T-test.

Test procedure
There are two variants of the signed-rank test. From a theoretical point of view, the one-sample test is more fundamental because the paired sample test is performed by converting the data to the situation of the one-sample test. However, most practical applications of the signed-rank test arise from paired data.

For a paired sample test, the data consists of samples . Each sample is a pair of measurements. In the simplest case, the measurements are on an interval scale. Then they may be converted to real numbers, and the paired sample test is converted to a one-sample test by replacing each pair of numbers  by its difference . In general, it must be possible to rank the differences between the pairs. This requires that the data be on an ordered metric scale, a type of scale that carries more information than an ordinal scale but may have less than an interval scale.

The data for a one-sample test is a set of real number samples . Assume for simplicity that the samples have distinct absolute values and that no sample equals zero. (Zeros and ties introduce several complications; see below.) The test is performed as follows:

 Compute .
 Sort , and use this sorted list to assign ranks : The rank of the smallest observation is one, the rank of the next smallest is two, and so on.
 Let  denote the sign function:  if  and  if . The test statistic is the signed-rank sum : 
 Produce a -value by comparing  to its distribution under the null hypothesis.

Additionally, if  is such that , then  for all .

The signed-rank sum  is closely related to two other test statistics. The positive-rank sum  and the negative-rank sum  are defined by

The positive-rank sum and negative-rank sum have alternative interpretations that are useful for the theory behind the test. Define the Walsh average  to be . Then:

Null and alternative hypotheses

One-sample test
The one-sample Wilcoxon signed-rank test can be used to test whether data comes from a symmetric population with a specified median. If the population median is known, then it can be used to test whether data is symmetric about its center.

To explain the null and alternative hypotheses formally, assume that the data consists of independent and identically distributed samples from a distribution . Set

Assume that  is continuous. The one-sample Wilcoxon signed-rank sum test is a test for the following null hypothesis against one of the following alternative hypotheses:
 Null hypothesis H0  
 One-sided alternative hypothesis H1  .
 One-sided alternative hypothesis H2  .
 Two-sided alternative hypothesis H3  .
The alternative hypothesis being tested depends on whether the test statistic is used to compute a one-sided or two-sided p-value (and if one-sided, which side).

Restricting the distributions of interest can lead to more interpretable null and alternative hypotheses. One mildly restrictive assumption is that  has a unique median. If the existence of a unique pseudomedian can be assumed true under both the null and alternative hypotheses, then these hypotheses can be restated as:

Most often, the null and alternative hypotheses are stated under the assumption of symmetry. Fix a real number . Define  to be symmetric about  if a random variable  with distribution  satisfies  for all . If  has a density function , then  is symmetric about  if and only if  for every .

If the null and alternative distributions of  can be assumed symmetric, then the null and alternative hypotheses simplify to the following:
If this median is unique, then the Wilcoxon signed-rank sum test becomes a test for the location of the median.

The restriction that the alternative distribution is symmetric is highly restrictive, but for one-sided tests it can be weakened. Say that  is stochastically smaller than a distribution symmetric about zero if an -distributed random variable  satisfies  for all . Similarly,  is stochastically larger than a distribution symmetric about zero if  for all . Then the Wilcoxon signed-rank sum test can also be used for the following null and alternative hypotheses:
 One-sided alternative hypothesis H1   is stochastically smaller than a distribution symmetric about zero.
 One-sided alternative hypothesis H2   is stochastically larger than a distribution symmetric about zero.

The hypothesis that the data are IID can be weakened. Each data point may be taken from a different distribution, as long as all the distributions are assumed to be continuous and symmetric about a common point .

Paired data test
Because the paired data test arises from taking paired differences, its null and alternative hypotheses can be derived from those of the one-sample test. In each case, they become assertions about the behavior of the differences .

Let  be the joint cumulative distribution of the pairs . If  is continuous, then the most general null and alternative hypotheses are expressed in terms of

and are identical to the one-sample case:
 Null hypothesis H0  
 One-sided alternative hypothesis H1  .
 One-sided alternative hypothesis H2  .
 Two-sided alternative hypothesis H3  .
Like the one-sample case, under some restrictions the test can be interpreted as a test for whether the pseudomedian of the differences is located at zero.

A common restriction is to symmetric distributions of differences. In this case, the null and alternative hypotheses are:
These can also be expressed more directly in terms of the original pairs:
 Null hypothesis H0  The observations  are exchangeable, meaning that  and  have the same distribution. Equivalently, .
The null hypothesis of exchangeability can arise from a matched pair experiment with a treatment group and a control group. Randomizing the treatment and control within each pair makes the observations exchangeable.

Because the one-sample test can be used as a one-sided test for stochastic dominance, the paired difference Wilcoxon test can be used to compare the following hypotheses:
 Null hypothesis H0  The observations  are exchangeable.
 One-sided alternative hypothesis H1  The differences  are stochastically smaller than a distribution symmetric about zero, that is, for every , .
 One-sided alternative hypothesis H2  The differences  are stochastically larger than a distribution symmetric about zero, that is, for every , .

Zeros and ties
It can also happen that there are tied samples. This is particularly common for discrete data. When this happens, the test procedure defined above is usually undefined because there is no way to uniquely rank the data. (The sole exception is if there is a single sample  which is zero and no other zeros or ties.) Because of this, the test statistic needs to be modified.

Zeros
Wilcoxon's original paper did not address the question of observations (or, in the paired sample case, differences) that equal zero. However, in later surveys, he recommended removing zeros from the sample. Then the standard signed-rank test could be applied to the resulting data, as long as there were no ties. This is now called the reduced sample procedure.

Pratt observed that the reduced sample procedure can lead to paradoxical behavior. He gives the following example. Suppose that we are in the one-sample situation and have the following thirteen observations:
0, 2, 3, 4, 6, 7, 8, 9, 11, 14, 15, 17, −18.
The reduced sample procedure removes the zero. To the remaining data, it assigns the signed ranks:
1, 2, 3, 4, 5, 6, 7, 8, 9, 10, 11, −12.
Pratt argues that one would expect that decreasing the observations should certainly not make the data appear more positive. However, if the zero observation is decreased by an amount less than 2, or if all observations are decreased by an amount less than 1, then the signed ranks become:
−1, 2, 3, 4, 5, 6, 7, 8, 9, 10, 11, 12, −13.
Therefore the sample would be judged significantly positive at any significance level .

Pratt therefore proposed the signed-rank zero procedure. This procedure includes the zeros when ranking the samples. However, it excludes them from the test statistic, or equivalently it defines . Pratt proved that the signed-rank zero procedure has several desirable behaviors not shared by the reduced sample procedure:
 Increasing the observed values does not make a significantly positive sample insignificant, and it does not make an insignificant sample significantly negative.
 A sample is significantly positive, not significant, or significantly negative, if and only if it is so when the zeros are assigned arbitrary non-zero signs, if and only if it is so when the zeros are replaced with non-zero values which are smaller in absolute value than any non-zero observation.
 For a fixed significance threshold , and for a test which is randomized to have level exactly , the probability of calling a set of observations significantly positive (respectively, significantly negative) is a non-decreasing (respectively, non-increasing) function of the observations.

The signed-rank zero procedure has the disadvantage that, when zeros occur, the null distribution of the test statistic changes, so tables of p-values can no longer be used.

When the data is on a Likert scale with equally spaced categories, the signed-rank zero procedure is more likely to maintain the Type I error rate than the reduced sample procedure.

From the viewpoint of statistical efficiency, there is no perfect rule for handling zeros. Conover found examples of null and alternative hypotheses that show that neither Wilcoxon's and Pratt's methods are uniformly better than the other. When comparing a discrete uniform distribution to a distribution where probabilities linearly increase from left to right, Pratt's method outperforms Wilcoxon's.

Ties
When the data does not have ties, the ranks  are used to calculate the test statistic. In the presence of ties, the ranks are not defined. There are two main approaches to resolving this.

The most common procedure for handling ties, and the one originally recommended by Wilcoxon, is called the average rank or midrank procedure. This procedure assigns numbers between 1 and n to the observations, with two observations getting the same number if and only if they have the same absolute value. The rank assigned to an observation is the average of the possible ranks it would have if the ties were broken in all possible ways. Once the ranks are assigned, the test statistic is computed in the same way as usual.

For example, suppose that the observations satisfy

If the ties among the observations with absolute value  were broken, then these observations would occupy ranks  through . The average rank procedure therefore assigns them the rank .

Under the average rank procedure, the null distribution is different in the presence of ties. The average rank procedure also has some disadvantages that are similar to those of the reduced sample procedure for zeros. It is possible that a sample can be judged significantly positive by the average rank procedure; but increasing some of the values so as to break the ties, or breaking the ties in any way whatsoever, results in a sample that the test judges to be not significant. However, increasing all the observed values by the same amount cannot turn a significantly positive result into an insignificant one, nor an insignificant one into a significantly negative one.

The other common option for handling ties is a tiebreaking procedure. In a tiebreaking procedure, the observations are assigned distinct ranks in the set . The rank assigned to an observation depends on its absolute value and the tiebreaking rule. Observations with smaller absolute values are always given smaller ranks, just as in the standard rank-sum test. The tiebreaking rule is used to assign ranks to observations with the same absolute value. One advantage of tiebreaking rules is that they allow the use of standard tables for computing p-values.

Random tiebreaking breaks the ties at random. Under random tiebreaking, the null distribution is the same as when there are no ties, but the result of the test depends not only on the data but on additional random choices. Averaging the ranks over the possible random choices results in the average rank procedure. One could also report the probability of rejection over all random choices. Random tiebreaking has the advantage that the probability that a sample is judged significantly positive does not decrease when some observations are increased. Conservative tiebreaking breaks the ties in favor of the null hypothesis. When performing a one-sided test in which negative values of  tend to be more significant, ties are broken by assigning lower ranks to negative observations and higher ranks to positive ones. Pratt observes that when ties are likely, the conservative tiebreaking procedure "presumably has low power, since it amounts to breaking all ties in favor of the null hypothesis."

The average rank procedure can disagree with tiebreaking procedures. Pratt gives the following example. Suppose that the observations are:
1, 1, 1, 1, 2, 3, −4.
The average rank procedure assigns these the signed ranks
2.5, 2.5, 2.5, 2.5, 5, 6, −7.
This sample is significantly positive at the one-sided level . On the other hand, any tiebreaking rule will assign the ranks
1, 2, 3, 4, 5, 6, −7.
At the same one-sided level , this is not significant.

Two other options for handling ties are based around averaging the results of tiebreaking. In the average statistic method, the test statistic  is computed for every possible way of breaking ties, and the final statistic is the mean of the tie-broken statistics.  In the average probability method, the p-value is computed for every possible way of breaking ties, and the final p-value is the mean of the tie-broken p-values.

Computing the null distribution
Computing p-values requires knowing the distribution of  under the null hypothesis. There is no closed formula for this distribution. Under the null hypothesis that the data is symmetric about zero, each  is exactly as likely to be positive as it is negative. Therefore the probability that  under the null hypothesis is equal to the number of sign combinations that yield  divided by the number of possible sign combinations . This can be used to compute the exact distribution of  under the null hypothesis.

The recursive formula is

Under the null hypothesis, the probability mass function of  satisfies . The function  is closely related to the integer partition function.

If  is the probability that  under the null hypothesis when there are  samples, then  satisfies a similar recursion:

with similar boundary conditions. There is also a recursive formula for the cumulative distribution function .

For very large , even the above recursion is too slow. In this case, the null distribution can be approximated.

Better approximations can be produced using Edgeworth expansions. Using a fourth-order Edgeworth expansion shows that:

where

The technical underpinnings of these expansions are rather involved, because conventional Edgeworth expansions apply to sums of IID continuous random variables, while  is a sum of non-identically distributed discrete random variables.

The moment generating function of  has the exact formula:

When zeros are present and the signed-rank zero procedure is used, or when ties are present and the average rank procedure is used, the null distribution of  changes. Cureton derived a normal approximation for this situation. The tie correction is

where the sum is over all the sizes  of each group of tied observations.

If

then

Alternative statistics
Wilcoxon originally defined the Wilcoxon rank-sum statistic to be . Early authors such as Siegel followed Wilcoxon. This is appropriate for two-sided hypothesis tests, but it cannot be used for one-sided tests.

These are called modified ranks.

Example

Notice that pairs 3 and 9 are tied in absolute value. They would be ranked 1 and 2, so each gets the average of those ranks, 1.5.

 that the median of pairwise differences is different from zero.
The -value for this result is

Effect size

To compute an effect size for the signed-rank test, one can use the rank-biserial correlation.

If the test statistic T is reported, the rank correlation r is equal to the test statistic T divided by the total rank sum S, or r = T/S.
 Using the above example, the test statistic is T = 9. The sample size of 9 has a total rank sum of S = (1 + 2 + 3 + 4 + 5 + 6 + 7 + 8 + 9) = 45. Hence, the rank correlation is 9/45, so r = 0.20.

If the test statistic T is reported, an equivalent way to compute the rank correlation is with the difference in proportion between the two rank sums, which is the Kerby (2014) simple difference formula. To continue with the current example, the sample size is 9, so the total rank sum is 45. T is the smaller of the two rank sums, so T is 3 + 4 + 5 + 6 = 18. From this information alone, the remaining rank sum can be computed, because it is the total sum S minus T, or in this case 45 − 18 = 27. Next, the two rank-sum proportions are 27/45 = 60% and 18/45 = 40%. Finally, the rank correlation is the difference between the two proportions (.60 minus .40), hence r = .20.

Software implementations
 R includes an implementation of the test as wilcox.test(x,y, paired=TRUE), where x and y are vectors of equal length.
 ALGLIB includes implementation of the Wilcoxon signed-rank test in C++, C#, Delphi, Visual Basic, etc.
 GNU Octave implements various one-tailed and two-tailed versions of the test in the wilcoxon_test function.
 SciPy includes an implementation of the Wilcoxon signed-rank test in Python
 Accord.NET includes an implementation of the Wilcoxon signed-rank test in C# for .NET applications
 MATLAB implements this test using "Wilcoxon rank sum test" as [p,h] = signrank(x,y) also returns a logical value indicating the test decision. The result h = 1 indicates a rejection of the null hypothesis, and h = 0 indicates a failure to reject the null hypothesis at the 5% significance level
 Julia HypothesisTests package includes the Wilcoxon signed-rank test as "value(SignedRankTest(x, y))"

See also
Mann–Whitney–Wilcoxon test
Sign test

References

External links
Wilcoxon Signed-Rank Test in R
Example of using the Wilcoxon signed-rank test
An online version of the test
A table of critical values for the Wilcoxon signed-rank test
Brief guide by experimental psychologist Karl L. Weunsch - Nonparametric effect size estimators (Copyright 2015 by Karl L. Weunsch)
Kerby, D. S. (2014). The simple difference formula: An approach to teaching nonparametric correlation. Comprehensive Psychology, volume 3, article 1. doi:10.2466/11.IT.3.1. link to article

Statistical tests
Nonparametric statistics
U-statistics